The Northern Tutchone are a First Nations people of the Athabaskan-speaking ethnolinguistic group living mainly in the central Yukon in Canada.

Language and culture 
The Northern Tutchone language, originally spoken by the Northern Tutchone people, is a variety of the Tutchone language, part of the Athabaskan language family.
Song Keeper Jerry Alfred is leading a movement to keep the language alive through his music.

Governments 
Northern Tutchone First Nations governments and communities include:
First Nation of Na-Cho Nyäk Dun (Mayo, Yukon) (Na-Cho Nyäk Dun - "Big River People", because they called the Stewart River Na Cho Nyak, meaning Big River, most northerly Northern Tutchone First Nation)
Little Salmon/Carmacks First Nation (Carmacks, Yukon) (Tagé Cho Hudän - "Big River People")
Selkirk First Nation (Pelly Crossing, Yukon) (Hućha Hudän - "Flatland People", because of the landscape in Fort Selkirk, where the land is flat on both sides of the river)
White River First Nation (Beaver Creek, Yukon)

External links 
 Tutchone, Canadian Encyclopedia

Northern Tutchone